David Hawkins may refer to:

David Hawkins (basketball) (born 1982), American basketball player
David Hawkins (bishop) (born 1949), Bishop of Barking
David Hawkins (philosopher) (1913–2002), American professor and philosopher
David Hawkins (RAF officer) (1937–2019), Royal Air Force officer
David Hawkins (swimmer) (1933–2020), Australian swimmer
J. David Hawkins (born 1945), American academic in the field of social work

See also
Samuel David Hawkins (born 1933), American, youngest defector of the Korean War